Chariaster is an extinct genus of prehistoric starfish in the family Ophidiasteridae. The species C. elegans is found only at Abou Roach (Cretaceous of Egypt).

See also 
 List of prehistoric echinoderm genera
 List of prehistoric starfish genera

References

External links 

 
 

Prehistoric starfish genera
Ophidiasteridae